World Map Set is a supplement for fantasy role-playing games published by Judges Guild in 1982.

Contents
World Map Set is a campaign setting: a laminated set of all 18 Wilderness maps.

Publication history
World Map Set was published by Judges Guild in 1982 as 18 maps.

Reception

References

Judges Guild fantasy role-playing game supplements
Role-playing game supplements introduced in 1982